Robson Alves de Barros (born 12 November 1997), known as Robson Bambu or just Robson, is a Brazilian professional footballer who plays as a centre-back for Campeonato Brasileiro Série A club Vasco da Gama, on loan from Ligue 1 club Nice.

Club career

Santos

Born in São Vicente, São Paulo, Bambu joined Santos' youth setup in 2007 at the age of ten. On 4 August 2016, he extended his contract until November 2018.

In January 2018, Bambu was promoted to the main squad by new manager Jair Ventura. He made his professional debut on 28 January, starting in a 1–1 Campeonato Paulista home draw against Ituano.

Bambu made his Série A debut on 25 August 2018, coming on as a first-half substitute for injured Gustavo Henrique in a 2–0 home win against Bahia. Three days later he made his Copa Libertadores debut, replacing injured Lucas Veríssimo in a 0–0 home draw against Independiente.

Athletico Paranaense
On 21 November 2018, Bambu was announced at Athletico Paranaense for the 2019 season.

Nice 
On 5 June 2020, Bambu joined Nice in a deal worth €8 million euros. He played his first match for the club on 23 August, in a 2–1 Ligue 1 win against Lens.

International career
Bambu was called up to Brazil under-20s in August 2016, for a friendly against England. In December, he was included in Rogério Micale's 23-man squad for the 2017 South American Youth Football Championship in the place of injured Gustavo Cascardo, appearing twice during the tournament.

Career statistics

Honours
Athletico Paranaense
Campeonato Paranaense: 2019
J.League Cup / Copa Sudamericana Championship: 2019
Copa do Brasil: 2019

References

External links
Santos FC profile 

1997 births
Living people
People from São Vicente, São Paulo
Brazilian footballers
Association football defenders
Campeonato Brasileiro Série A players
Ligue 1 players
Santos FC players
Club Athletico Paranaense players
Sport Club Corinthians Paulista players
CR Vasco da Gama players
OGC Nice players
Brazil under-20 international footballers
Brazilian expatriate footballers
Expatriate footballers in France
Footballers from São Paulo (state)